Letya Pyanchi (d.  April 1413) was governor of Prome (Pyay) from 1390 to 1413. The governor, a Hanthawaddy royal, was a key Ava commander in the Forty Years' War against Hanthawaddy Pegu.

Brief
He was a Hanthawaddy royal, and son-in-law of Viceroy Laukpya of Myaungmya. His Mon language title is reported in Burmese as Bya Kyin or Bya Kyi. Kyin remained loyal to his father-in-law who in 1384 decided to revolt against the new king at Pegu, Razadarit. Their rebellion in the Irrawaddy delta lasted for the next five years with the help of King Swa Saw Ke of Ava.

Kyin and his brother-in-law Bya Kun were driven out by Razadarit's invasion of the delta in 1389–90. Swa Saw Ke welcomed the duo, and appointed Bya Kun governor of Salin with the title of Nawrahta, and Bya Kyin governor of Prome (Pyay) with the title of Letya Pyanchi. It was early 1390. He ruled, Prome, a key province and the gateway to Upper Burma for the next 22+ years. He fought several campaigns in the Forty Years' War. He was wounded by an arrow at the battle of Hmawbi  April 1413. He died en route to Prome, soon after having reached Dagon.

Military service
All his campaigns were part of the Forty Years' War on the side of Ava.

Notes

References

Bibliography
 
 
 

Ava dynasty
Hanthawaddy dynasty